South Circle was an American hip hop group composed of Houston rappers Mr. Mike (Mike Walls) and Thorough (Rex Robeson) that was signed to Suave House Records in the mid-90s.

The duo's only album, Anotha Day Anotha Balla was released on July 4, 1995. The album had two singles released, "New Day" and "Attitudes" and peaked at 63 on the Billboard 200. South Circle disbanded in 1997 after making an appearance on the 1997 Suave House compilation, The Album of the Year.

Prior to the group disbanding, Mr. Mike embarked on a solo career. His debut album, Wicked Wayz was released while the group was still together and broke into the top 40 on the Billboard 200, peaking at 29. After the group disbanded Mr. Mike continued releasing studio albums, while Thorough made guest appearances on other albums through 2003 before virtually disappearing from the music industry. Mr Mike's son Trill JHill is currently in the music industry with his first single "famous Dexter"

Discography

Studio albums

American hip hop groups
Musical groups established in 1995
Musical groups disestablished in 1997
Southern hip hop groups
Suave House Records artists
American musical duos
Gangsta rap groups
G-funk groups